Catocala irene, or Irene's underwing, is a moth of the family Erebidae first described by Hans Hermann Behr in 1870. It is found in the western United States in Utah  and California and Nevada.

The wingspan is 65–75 mm. Adults are on wing from July to September depending on the location. There is probably one generation per year.

The larvae feed on Populus and Salix species.

Subspecies
Catocala irene irene
Catocala irene valeria H. Edwards, 1880 (Arizona)

References

External links
Species info

Moths described in 1870
irene
Moths of North America